The 1999–2000 Ohio State Buckeyes men's basketball represented Ohio State University during the 1999–2000 NCAA Division I men's basketball season. Led by third-year head coach Jim O'Brien, the Buckeyes finished 23–7 (13–3 Big Ten) and reached the second round of the NCAA tournament.

Roster

Schedule and results 

|-
!colspan=9 style= | Regular Season
|-

|-
!colspan=9 style= | Big Ten Tournament

|-
!colspan=9 style= | NCAA Tournament

Rankings

NBA draft selections

References

Ohio State
Ohio State Buckeyes men's basketball seasons
Ohio State Buckeyes
Ohio State Buckeyes
Ohio State